Rachel E. Klevit is professor of biochemistry, adjunct professor of chemistry, and adjunct professor of pharmacology at the University of Washington. She holds the Edmond H. Fischer-Washington Research Foundation Endowed Chair in Biochemistry.  Klevit's research focuses on molecular interactions in human diseases and includes research on BRCA1, the protein ubiquitination system, and human heat shock proteins.

Education
Klevit received her B.A. in 1978 from Reed College and her D.Phil. from Oxford University in 1981. She completed her post-doctoral training at Duke University Medical Center.

Awards
Klevit was awarded a Rhodes Scholarship in 1978 to attend Oxford University.  She received the Margaret Oakley Dayhoff Award in Biophysics from the Biophysical Society in 1987–1988, the Fritz Lippmann Award from the American Society for Biochemistry and Molecular Biology in 2015, and the Dorothy Crowfoot Hodgkin Award from the Protein Society in 2016.

In 2021, she was elected member of the U. S. National Academy of Sciences.

References

External links
 Faculty web page
 Department of Pharmacology web page
 Description of work on BRCA1 structure

Living people
Place of birth missing (living people)
Year of birth missing (living people)
American women biologists
University of Washington faculty
Reed College alumni
American women academics
Members of the United States National Academy of Sciences
21st-century American women